The University of the Philippines Cineastes' Studio, commonly known as UP Cineastes' Studio or UP Cineastes, is a student film organization based at the UP Film Institute of the College of Mass Communication, University of the Philippines Diliman. 

The organization's main advocacies are film literacy and critical thought, reflected in the activities initiated and partnerships undertaken by the organization. Such activities include Film Literacy Workshops for high school students, Film Production Workshops for communities, SPLICE (the official publication of UP Cineastes' Studio), contests, screenings, thesis exposures, and academic tie-ups.

Cineastes
The organization's name is derived from the film term cineaste, a word that comes from the 20th century French fusion of the words cinematographe and enthusiaste.

History
U.P. Cineastes' Studio (pronounced as si-ne-yasts), is the first film organization for students in the Philippines, established on September 24, 1984, preceding that of the film department of the UP College of Mass Communication. It started out as an organization for film students of the University of the Philippines Diliman, but later on expanded to include students from other colleges as well. 

In the past decade, UP Cineastes' Studio has initiated activities for the promotion of Philippine Independent Cinema to the student community, due to its staging of the university leg of some of the largest independent film festivals in the country, the Cinemalaya Independent Film Festival, Cinema One Originals, and QCinema. In 2013, the first CineFilipino Film Festival was also brought to the university through the organization.

The organization has also taken part in smaller film competitions sponsored by companies such as Maynilad Water Services  and Hyundai. UP Cineastes, in its flagship event Cineastes Presents, co-organizes premieres and special screenings with talkbacks from filmmakers of independent films like Zombadings 1: Patayin sa Shokot si Remington, Citizen Jake, Signal Rock, ICYMI: I See Me, and Kuwaresma.

UP Cineastes' Studio was home to prominent figures in Philippine media such as directors Cathy Garcia-Molina, Irene Villamor, broadcasters and television personalities Kim Atienza and Christine Bersola-Babao, as well as Eraserheads then-frontman Ely Buendia. It was also home to young directors and filmmakers such as Jade Castro, Petersen Vargas, Carlo Francisco Manatad, and Glenn Barit.

Executive Board

Membership 
Membership is open to all students of the University of the Philippines Diliman regardless of degree program and/or home college. Membership application is held on a two-month process held every semester, beginning on September for the First Semester, and on February for the Second Semester of the Academic Year. Applicants are then immersed to various film workshops and activities. 

Members are sorted to specific committees and are expected to contribute to the different events staged by the organization throughout the year. Membership can be renewed every semester until graduation. At its peak, UP Cineastes' Studio has more than a hundred active members on a single semester, making it one of the largest academic organizations in the university.

References

Film organizations in the Philippines
1984 establishments in the Philippines
Student organizations established in 1984